The 2001 Croatian Cup Final was a two-legged affair played between Hajduk Split and Dinamo Zagreb. 
The first leg was played in Split on 9 May 2001, while the second leg on 23 May 2001 in Zagreb.

Dinamo Zagreb won the trophy with an aggregate result of 3–0.

Road to the final

First leg

Second leg

External links
Official website 

Croatian Football Cup Finals
HNK Hajduk Split matches
GNK Dinamo Zagreb matches
Cup